The South African type XM1 tender was a steam locomotive tender.

Type XM1 tenders were Type TM tenders which were reclassified after their intermediate draw and buffing gear were altered to an "X_" tender configuration. They first entered service in 1912, as tenders to the SAR Class MC  Denver type Mallet locomotive.

Origin
Type TM tenders were built between 1910 and 1912 by the North British Locomotive Company (NBL). The two Type XM1 tenders originally entered service on the South African Railways (SAR) in 1912, as Type TM tenders to Class MC  Denver type Mallet locomotives.

Rebuilding
At some stage before 1941, the intermediate draw and buffing gear of two of the tenders, numbers 1607 and 1615, were altered to an "X_" tender configuration. These two tenders were reclassified to Type XM1.

Characteristics

Classification letters
Since many tender types are interchangeable between different locomotive classes and types, a tender classification system was adopted by the SAR. The first letter of the tender type indicates the classes of engines to which it could be coupled. The "X_" tenders could be used with the following locomotive classes:
 Cape Government Railways Mountain, SAR Class 4.
 SAR Class 4A.
 SAR Class 5.
 Cape Government Railways 6th Class of 1897, SAR Class 6B.
 Oranje-Vrijstaat Gouwerment-Spoorwegen (OVGS) 6th Class L3, SAR Class 6E.
 Cape Government Railways 6th Class of 1901 (Neilson, Reid), SAR Class 6H.
 Cape Government Railways 6th Class of 1902, SAR Class 6J.
 Cape Government Railways 8th Class of 1902, SAR Class 8.
 Imperial Military Railways (IMR) 8th Class, SAR Class 8A.
 Central South African Railways Class 8-L2, SAR Class 8B.
 Central South African Railways Class 8-L3, SAR Class 8C.
 Cape Government Railways 8th Class 4-8-0 of 1903, SAR Class 8D.
 Cape Government Railways 8th Class Experimental, SAR Class 8E.
 Cape Government Railways 8th Class 4-8-0 of 1904, SAR Class 8F.
 Cape Government Railways 8th Class 2-8-0 of 1903, SAR Class 8Y.
 Cape Government Railways 8th Class 2-8-0 of 1904, SAR Class 8Z.
 Central South African Railways Class 9, SAR Class 9.
 Central South African Railways Class 10, SAR Class 10.
 Central South African Railways Class 10-2 Saturated, SAR Class 10A.
 Central South African Railways Class 10-2 Superheated. SAR Class 10B.
 Central South African Railways Class 10-C, SAR Class 10C.
 Central South African Railways Class 11, SAR Class 11.
 Cape Government Railways 9th Class of 1903, SAR Class Experimental 4.
 Cape Government Railways 9th Class of 1906, SAR Class Experimental 5.
 Cape Government Railways 10th Class, SAR Class Experimental 6.
 SAR Class ME.
 Central South African Railways Mallet Superheated, SAR Class MF.

The second letter indicates the tender's water capacity.

A number, when added after the letter code, indicates differences between similar tender types such as function, wheelbase or coal bunker capacity.

References

XM1